Frenchman's Cove is a town on the west coast of Burin Peninsula, Newfoundland and Labrador, Canada. It had a population of 159 in the Canada 2021 Census, a drop from 172 in 2011. The town has been inhabited since before 1836, the earliest known documentation about it, when it appeared in the first Newfoundland Census. According to local folklore and tradition, the first settlers were named Cleuetts and were of French origin. The small-boat inshore fishery was the economic mainstay of the area until the late 1800s when did men went work on the schooners operating from Grand Bank. Residents also grew turnips, cabbages, and potatoes, as well as hay for their horses, cattle, sheep, and chickens.

Nearby Frenchman's Cove Provincial Park, is next to a large barachois, sand and mud flats, mixed forest, and tidal lagoons. Wildlife in the area includes sea and terrestrial birds, including Canada Geese.

Demographics 

References

External links
 

Towns in Newfoundland and Labrador